Anash and the Legacy of the Sun-Rock is a half-hour children's show produced by Panacea Entertainment for the Aboriginal Peoples Television Network, an aboriginal television network in Canada. It was part of the APTN Kids lineup. A mid-1800s, animated children's show based on Tlingit cultural stories about maintaining principles.

Cast
Jess Arfi as Anash, an orphan and warrior on a quest to reunite the separated parts of the mythical Sun-Rock
Colin Van Loon as Kole, his servant and adopted brother.

Streaming
As of October 2019 the series has been released online on the Canada Media Fund's Encore+ YouTube channel.

References

External links
 Anash and the Legacy of the Sun-Rock – Official website.
 

Aboriginal Peoples Television Network original programming
Canadian children's adventure television series
2007 Canadian television series debuts
2000s Canadian children's television series
English-language television shows
Television series about orphans
First Nations television series